FC Barcelona did not repeat its successful season in 1993–94, and fell back to fourth in La Liga, as well as knocked out of the Champions League in the quarter-finals by Paris Saint-Germain.

Barcelona did not perform well in the mid season and lost the league title to Real Madrid by 10 points behind included an humiliating defeat by 0–5 in Madrid, despite this Johan Cruyff was not let go by the club, taking over to the 1995–96 season.

The side managed to win the Supercopa by defeating 1994 Copa del Rey winners Real Zaragoza.

Romário left the club in January transferred out to Flamengo. At the end of the season Hristo Stoichkov was transferred out to Parma and Ronald Koeman left the club after 5 seasons.

Squad
Correct as of 23 October 2009.

Transfers

Winter

Competitions

La Liga

League table

Results by round

Matches

Goalscorers
9.Hristo Stoichkov
9.Jordi Cruyff
9.Ronald Koeman
6.Begiristain
4.Guillermo Amor
4.Jose Mari Bakero
4.Abelardo
4.Gheorghe Hagi
4.Romario
2.Miguel Angel Nadal
2.Pep Guardiola
1.Sergi Barjuan
1.Iván Iglesias
1.Escaich

Copa del Rey

Round of 16

Supercopa de España

UEFA Champions League

Group stage

Quarterfinals

Friendlies

Statistics

Players statistics

See also
FC Barcelona
1993–94 La Liga
Copa del Rey
Spanish Super Cup

References

External links
 FC Barcelona Official Site
 FCBarcelonaweb.co.uk English Speaking FC Barcelona Supporters
 ESPNsoccernet: Barcelona Team Page 
 FC Barcelona (Spain) profile
 uefa.com - UEFA Champions League
 Web Oficial de la Liga de Fútbol Profesional
 FIFA.com
 Federació Catalana de Futbol

FC Barcelona seasons
Barcelona